Noah Petrovich Adamia (Noe Adamia, ; 21 December 1917 – 3 July 1942) was a Georgian Soviet sniper of the Soviet Maritime Forces during World War II and Hero of the Soviet Union.

He participated in the Sevastopol sniper movement and personally trained about 80 snipers. Adamia is credited with having killed over 200 German soldiers during the Battle of Sevastopol, before he was killed in action a day before the siege lifted.

Pre-war period

Born on 21 December 1917 into a peasant family in the Georgian village of Mathondzhi, he attended a high school in Tbilisi. Afterwards Adamia joined the Soviet Navy in 1938 and served in coastal defenses as anti-aircraft gunner. In 1940 he graduated from the Odessa Military Naval School and became platoon commander.

World War II, Battle of Sevastopol

Serving at the front lines since 1941, he decided to become active as sharpshooter by own will and in 1942 due to his impressive efficiency with the rifle was given instructor status and ordered to train more than 70 marines of the Soviet 7th Marine Brigade stationed in Sevastopol in sniper warfare. He had mastered sharpshooting by himself and was engaged in the most dangerous areas of the district. Within two months he had all candidates prepared for combat. Up until becoming platoon commander, Adamia was credited with having killed more than 200 enemy soldiers and knocking out two enemy tanks. On 21 June 1942, facing encirclement by German troops, the petty officer led a small 11 man strong sniper detachment to break the ring in which they succeeded, killing more than 100 enemy soldiers. The fierce battle went on even out of the encirclement.

Sniper tactics

From December 1941 Adamiya became pioneer of the Sevastopol sniper movement. In the beginning his primary targets were enplaced positions but he soon moved on for active hunts using both the Simonov PTRS-41 anti-materiel rifle and the Mosin–Nagant sniper rifle to take out soft and lightly armored targets. To one of the Soviet army news papers he said: Adamiya went on describing how he started to learn calculation of range, observing and slowly mastering the effects of humidity and other aspects of shooting from long distance. One day he took point on a tree covered high ground and observed German troops moving around their entrenched positions to keep themselves warm. He was able to take out six targets over a range of 600 m with his Mosin–Nagant and improved his rate each day after, going out for several days with only a loaf of bread and little water. Adamiya tried to determine when enemy forces would concentrate on a specific position for example by observing if improvised latrines or similar points were built. Yevgeniy Ivanovich Zhidilov wrote in his book "We defended Sevastopol":

Death
Adamia met his fate a day before Sevastopol fell to Axis forces on 4 July 1942. He was one of the 60,000 Soviet defenders who were not evacuated. On 3 July Adamia was killed in the area of Gasfort, Kamysheva Bay. He was buried in Sevastopol along with 86 soldiers of the 7th Marine Brigade.

Awards
For his outstanding performance and courage in the fight against Nazism and the actions in June 1942, the Presidium of the Supreme Soviet posthumously awarded Noah Petrovich Adamiya the title Hero of the Soviet Union, the Order of Lenin and the Medal of Valour on 24 July 1942. Due to restrictions on awards for marine servicemen, he was not awarded with higher honors. A street in the city of Sukhumi, Georgia is named after him.

See also
List of books, articles and documentaries about snipers

References

1917 births
1942 deaths
People from Imereti
Mingrelians
Military personnel from Georgia (country)
Soviet military snipers
Heroes of the Soviet Union
People of World War II from Georgia (country)
Soviet military personnel killed in World War II
Soviet Navy personnel
Recipients of the Order of Lenin
Recipients of the Medal "For Courage" (Russia)